Rodny Lopes Cabral (born 28 January 1995) is a professional footballer who plays as a right-back for SVV Scheveningen. Born in the Netherlands, Lopes Cabral represents the Cape Verde national football team.

Club career
On 18 August 2017, Lopes Cabral made his professional  debut in the Eerste Divisie, in a game for SC Telstar against FC Eindhoven.

On 23 July 2019, Lopes Cabral moved to Liga I club Politehnica Iași and signed a two-year contract with the Romanian side.

International career
Born in the Netherlands, Lopes Cabral is of Cape Verdean descent. He debuted for the Cape Verde national team in a friendly 2–1 win over Togo on 10 October 2019.

References

External links
 
 NFT Profile

Living people
1995 births
Dutch sportspeople of Cape Verdean descent
Cape Verdean footballers
Dutch footballers
Footballers from Rotterdam
Association football fullbacks
Cape Verde international footballers
Netherlands youth international footballers
Eerste Divisie players
Liga I players
RVVH players
SC Telstar players
FC Politehnica Iași (2010) players
SVV Scheveningen players
Cape Verdean expatriate footballers
Dutch expatriate footballers
Cape Verdean expatriate sportspeople in Romania
Expatriate footballers in Romania